Cesare Alfieri di Sostegno (13 August 1799 – 16 April 1869) was an Italian politician and diplomat. He was prime minister of the Kingdom of Sardinia from 27 July 1848 to 15 August 1848.

Biography
Born in Turin, the cousin of poet Vittorio Alfieri, he began his diplomatic career in 1816 in the State Secretary, then he was assigned to the embassy in Paris, where he father was the representative of the Kingdom of Sardinia. Later he worked in the embassies of The Hague and Berlin, and then he took part as assistant in the congresses of Aachen (1818), Troppau (1820) and Ljubljana (1821). This experience granted Alfieri the title of ambassador in St. Petersburg in 1824.

Two years later he returned to Turin, where he received the position of First Squire of the throne heir, Charles Albert. In 1838 he was made member of the newly created Council of State and in 1842 of the Agrarian Association of Turin. In 1847 Alfieri became the first holder of the Ministry of Public Instruction. Together with Luigi Des Ambrois and Giacino Borelli, he was one of the authors of the Statuto Albertino, the first Italian constitution. On 3 April 1848 he was elected Senator, and served as Prime Minister of Sardinia from August to October 1848. He was President of the Senate of Sardinia from 1855 to 1860.

He died in Florence in 1869.

1799 births
1869 deaths
Diplomats from Turin
Prime ministers of the Kingdom of Sardinia
Members of the Senate of the Kingdom of Sardinia
Ambassadors of the Kingdom of Sardinia
18th-century Italian politicians
19th-century Italian politicians
Politicians from Turin